Dorothy Mead (1928–1975) was a British painter.

Biography
Mead was born in London, England, and adopted at three months old by a family in Walthamstow.  Her mother had a florists shop.

She first met David Bomberg when he was teaching at the South east Essex School of Art at Dagenham School of Art in 1944. She followed him when he moved to the City Literary Institute in London and then to the Borough Polytechnic where she studied under Bomberg from 1945 to 1951.  Mead was a founder member of the Borough Group in 1946 together with other pupils of Bomberg including Cliff Holden.

From 1956 until 1959, Mead was a mature student at the Slade School of Art. Here she met the artist and teacher Andrew Forge. She had a major influence on students such as Patrick Procktor and Mario Dubsky and was the first woman president of the student annual exhibiting society, Young Contemporaries (later renamed New Contemporaries), in 1959. The previous year, the Slade awarded her the Figure Painting Prize, and the Steer Prize. In 1959 she was asked to leave the Slade, in spite of her award-winning work, because she refused to sit the course on perspective. She believed - with Bomberg - that the stylistic approach was invalid. Her thesis, explaining her view was not accepted by the principal, William Coldstream.

In the Arts Council England series of touring exhibitions, Six Young Painters, Mead exhibited in 1964 with other artists including Peter Blake, William Crozier, David Hockney, Bridget Riley and Euan Uglow. Mead joined the London Group of artists in 1960. The New Statesman, the left-wing magazine singled her out, when critic David Sylvester remarked she "tends to affirm the supremacy of light, as women's painting often does."  Holden, her partner said "Dorothy sticks to her principals, but like myself and Bomberg was an outsider".

In 1964, Mead arrived as a lecturer at Goldsmiths College "like a breath of fresh air" according to pupil and painter Barry Martin.  She swept aside the old gentlemanly bohemian and class pretensions that she thought "stubborn preconceptions".  Her family saw her "living on the edge" of reality all the time.  She worked in a garret studio in Ladbroke Grove, yet went up to Berkeley Square to buy paints. She was described by Dennis Creffield, artist and fellow student of Bomberg, as having an "abundant personality...a great love of art...stylish in appearance."  Her daring, precarious act of existential expressionism can be seen in The Acrobat, an exhibition of 1970 at Borough Road Gallery.

Mead was President of the London Group from 1971 to 1973, succeeding Andrew Forge, a progressive art historian with whom she was long associated, and also had an affair with. Mead spent two spells teaching at Morley College: between 1963-5 she taught 'Painting', and from 1973-75 she taught 'Drawing & Painting' ("for advanced students of some considerable experience") and 'Improvisation from the Model' in the Morley Summer Painting School. Mead was also a part-time lecturer at Chelsea College of Art in London between 1962 and 1964.  She was a feminist with a principled individualism - she once remarked that if she changed her name to George, she stood a greater chance of selling her work!

The collection of the Tate Gallery and other art museums include work by Mead.
Mead's paintings were shown at the 1991 exhibition Bomberg and his Legacy, held in Eastbourne at the Towner Art Gallery.
In 2005, a retrospective exhibition was held thirty years after her death. Despite the esteem she had earned from fellow artists, it was her first ever solo exhibition.

Shortly following her death on 12 June 1975, it has been claimed that some of Mead's paintings were stolen from a secure warehouse in Essex, although this is disputed and no evidence to substantiate this has been published over the decades. 

One of Mead's two sisters, Valerie Long, has been the holder of a large number of Mead's works and has been represented by Waterhouse & Dodd for sales and disposals in recent years.

A List of Works 
 Portrait of Dinora Mendelson Oil on board (1947)
 Looking South Oil on Canvas (1947)
 Menton Harbour Oil on board (1947)
 Looking into the distance Oil on canvas (1947-8)
 Self portrait Oil on board (1953)
 Landscape Oil on board (Circa 1955)
 Self portrait Oil on canvas (Circa 1955)
 Nude study Charcoal on paper (1956)
 Rooftops Oil on board (1956)
 Cityscape Oil on canvas (1956)
 Landscape Charcoal on paper (1957)
 Portrait study Charcoal on paper (1957)
 Still life with flowers Charcoal on paper (1957)
 Self portrait study Charcoal on paper (1958)
 Still life Oil on canvas (1958)
 Still life Charcoal on paper (1959)
 Still life with flowers Charcoal on paper (1959)
 Life Room Oil on board (1959)
 Nude study Charcoal on paper (Oct 1959)
 Reclining with figure Oil on board (1961)
 Seated figure Oil on canvas (1962)
 Afternoon Oil on board (1962)
 Seascape (Holland-on-Sea) Oil on canvas (1966)
 The taking of Christ I Oil on canvas (1966)
 The Temptation (after Michelangelo) Oil on canvas (1966)
 Wheat fields Oil on canvas (1966) 
 The taking of Christ II Oil on canvas (1967)
 Arcade Oil on canvas (1967)
 Blue nude Oil on canvas (Circa 1968)
 Overlooking London Oil on canvas (1969) 
 Abstract composition Oil on canvas (1969)
 Pieta (after Van Gogh) Oil on canvas (1971)
 Woman in chair Oil on canvas (Circa 1972)
 Life class study Etching (ed.20) (Circa 1973)

References

External links
 

1928 births
1975 deaths
20th-century English painters
20th-century English women artists
Alumni of London South Bank University
Borough Group
Alumni of the Slade School of Fine Art
English women painters
Painters from London